Mathew Stuart Sinclair (born 9 November 1975) is an Australian-born New Zealand cricketer. He is a right-handed middle order batsman who has also opened the innings. He holds the equal world record for the highest Test score (214) by a number three batsman on debut when he opened his international career against West Indies in the 1999 Boxing Day Test.

Personal life
Born in Katherine, Northern Territory, Australia, Sinclair moved to New Zealand with his mother after the death of his father in an accident when Mathew was only five years old.

Domestic career
A right-handed middle-order batsman occasionally used as an opener, he played for Central Districts from the 1995–96 season, and in a period when the New Zealand cricket authorities were actively developing their infrastructure with the aim of raising the standards of the New Zealand team, he played for both Academy and A teams before making his Test debut.

When batting for Central Districts against Northern Districts in 1997, he was left not out on 99 when Grant Bradburn bowled a wide down the legside that beat the wicketkeeper and went for four runs ending the game. The Central Districts team felt that this was very unsporting of Grant Bradburn, who was subsequently fined $100 for the incident.

International career
He scored 214 on his debut, against West Indies at Wellington in 1999, and followed that with 204 not out against Pakistan in the following summer. But despite this most promising of starts, Sinclair struggled to gain a permanent place in both the Test and one-day sides after disappointing scores.  As a result, he was intermittently featured in the international squad, most recently being the One Day International against the West Indies at Eden Park in January 2009.

An injury to Michael Papps in 2004–05 saw him called into the tour of Bangladesh as a 'makeshift' opener.  His preferred position in the top of the middle-order was not available at the time.  He did enough on that tour to gain selection for the tour to Australia where he had mixed results in the Tests, but not enough to maintain his spot when the Australians crossed the Tasman later that summer.

His form in the ODIs in Australia was sufficient to retain his place for the return series, but he lost his place after averaging 15 in the first three matches.

Retirement
In July 2013 he announced his retirement from all cricket. At 37, after 18 seasons in the Central Districts side he is the team's all-time highest run-scorer, with more than 20,000 runs across all formats and remained a solid performer to the last, averaging over 40 in 2012–13. Sinclair found the transition from a cricketer to working outside of cricket very difficult. He worked in a sports shop for eight months before being made redundant. He now works as a real estate agent. In 2020, he was continuing to play club cricket in Napier.

References

External links

 
 Mathew Sinclair's Official Blog

1975 births
Central Districts cricketers
Living people
New Zealand cricketers
New Zealand One Day International cricketers
New Zealand Test cricketers
Cricketers who made a century on Test debut
Cricketers at the 2003 Cricket World Cup
New Zealand Twenty20 International cricketers
People educated at Palmerston North Boys' High School
Australian emigrants to New Zealand
Cricketers from the Northern Territory
Sportsmen from the Northern Territory
North Island cricketers